Arturo Bonilla Torres (born 23 January 1953) is a Honduran retired football midfielder.

He currently lives in Pompano Beach, Florida, where he works in the family boating business.

Club career
Nicknamed Pacharaca, Bonilla made his debut with Marathón in the 1972–73 season. He played his entire career at the club, retiring in 1985. In total, Bonilla played 271 matches and scored 57 goals. He has the record of match appearances in the club.

International career
Arturo Bonilla was part of the Honduras national football team in the qualification of 1974 FIFA World Cup.

Retirement
In 1985, Bonilla retired from soccer.

References

1953 births
Living people
Honduran footballers
People from Pompano Beach, Florida
People from Yoro Department
C.D. Marathón players
Association football midfielders
Honduras international footballers